Machel Cedenio (born 6 September 1995) is a Trinidadian sprinter specialising in the 400 metres. He represented his country at two outdoor and one indoor World Championships winning a silver medal in the relay at the 2015 outdoor edition. He competed at the 2016 Summer Olympics.  He qualified for the final and came fourth with a new personal best of 44.01 seconds.  This is the fastest fourth place time for the 400 metres.

International competitions

References

External links

1995 births
Living people
Trinidad and Tobago male sprinters
Pan American Games medalists in athletics (track and field)
Athletes (track and field) at the 2015 Pan American Games
Athletes (track and field) at the 2019 Pan American Games
World Athletics Championships athletes for Trinidad and Tobago
World Athletics Championships medalists
Athletes (track and field) at the 2016 Summer Olympics
Athletes (track and field) at the 2020 Summer Olympics
Olympic athletes of Trinidad and Tobago
Pan American Games gold medalists for Trinidad and Tobago
Pan American Games silver medalists for Trinidad and Tobago
Pan American Games bronze medalists for Trinidad and Tobago
Athletes (track and field) at the 2018 Commonwealth Games
People from Point Fortin
World Athletics Indoor Championships medalists
World Athletics Championships winners
Medalists at the 2015 Pan American Games
Medalists at the 2019 Pan American Games
Commonwealth Games competitors for Trinidad and Tobago
Commonwealth Games gold medallists for Trinidad and Tobago
Commonwealth Games medallists in athletics
Athletes (track and field) at the 2022 Commonwealth Games
Medallists at the 2022 Commonwealth Games